Michael Rex Giles (born 1 March 1942) is an English drummer, percussionist, and vocalist, best known as one of the co-founders of King Crimson in 1969. Prior to the formation of King Crimson, he was part of the eccentric pop trio Giles, Giles and Fripp along with his brother, bassist Peter, and guitarist Robert Fripp. They were active between 1967–1968.

Life and career
Giles was born in Waterlooville, Hampshire, England.

His drumming technique is complex and polyrhythmic, based primarily on the jazz tradition, but also on the then developing progressive rock tradition. His playing dictated much of the compositional structure of the first King Crimson album, In the Court of the Crimson King. Giles's compositional ear is evidenced by his ability to weave seamless tempo changes and subtle melodic deviations into his drumming throughout the album.
 
Giles and Ian McDonald both left King Crimson in December 1969, though Giles played on the band's second album, In the Wake of Poseidon as a session musician. He and McDonald recorded an album called McDonald and Giles, which was lighter in style than King Crimson, but still technically demanding. Giles then worked as a session player for the duration of the 1970s, appearing on albums by Anthony Phillips, Leo Sayer, and Kevin Ayers. He also played on McDonald's 1999 solo album Driver's Eyes.

Giles only solo album, Progress, was recorded at his home studio in 1978, but not released until 2003.

In 2002, he co-founded the 21st Century Schizoid Band, a group composed of former King Crimson musicians, with the exception of his son-in-law, guitarist and vocalist Jakko Jakszyk, who later joined King Crimson. After one studio session and a single tour, Giles passed the drum stool to another former King Crimson drummer, Ian Wallace.

In late 2008, an experimental group focused on improvisation was announced, Michael Giles' MAD Band, with Adrian Chivers and Dan Pennie.

He was often cited by Rush drummer Neil Peart as an influence.

Selected discography

Giles, Giles and Fripp
 1968 One in a Million/Newly Weds, Thursday Morning/Elephant Song (Singles)
 1968 The Cheerful Insanity of Giles, Giles and Fripp
 2001 The Brondesbury Tapes
 2001 Metamorphosis

King Crimson
 1969 In the Court of the Crimson King 
 1970 In the Wake of Poseidon

McDonald & Giles
 1970 McDonald and Giles

Luther Grosvenor
 1971 Under open skies

Murray Head
 1972 Nigel Lived

Jackson Heights
 1972 The Fifth Avenue Bus 
 1972 Ragamuffins Fool 
 1973 Bump n' Grind

Leo Sayer
 1973 Silverbird 
 1974 Just a Boy 
 1975 Another year

Kevin Ayers
 1974 The Confessions of Dr. Dream and Other Stories

Roger Glover & Guests
 1974 The Butterfly Ball and the Grasshopper's Feast

John G. Perry
 1976 Sunset Wading
 1995 Seabird

Anthony Phillips
 1978 Wise After the Event 
 1979 Sides

Ian McDonald
 1999 Drivers Eyes

21st Century Schizoid Band
 2002 Official Bootleg Volume One 
 2002 Live in Japan – Official Bootleg Volume Two

Solo
 2002 Progress (recorded in 1978)

Movie score
 1996 Ghost Dance (recorded in 1983, with Jamie Muir and David Cunningham)

References

1942 births
21st Century Schizoid Band members
Living people
English rock drummers
King Crimson members
Musicians from Bournemouth
People from Waterlooville
English session musicians
Progressive rock drummers
Penguin Cafe Orchestra members
Streetwalkers members